Come Out of the Pantry is a 1935 British musical film directed by Jack Raymond and starring Jack Buchanan, Fay Wray, James Carew and Fred Emney. It is based on a 1916 novel of the same name by Alice Duer Miller, and features musical numbers by Al Hoffman, Al Goodhart and Maurice Sigler.

Plot
A British aristocrat, Lord Robert Brent, travels to New York City to sell some paintings. He deposits the money from the sale in a bank, but when the bank collapses, he finds himself stranded in America with no money and many bills. By chance, Robert meets the old family butler, Eccles, who is now working in New York for the wealthy Beach-Howard family. Eccles helps Roberts to take up employment as a footman in the Beach-Howard household. Robert becomes romantically involved with the young niece, Hilda Beach-Howard. She begins to suspect his true identity. Robert's elder brother arrives in New York to find out what has happened to his sibling. The bank that holds Robert's money reopens, and Robert proposes marriage to Hilda whilst serving dinner. She accepts his proposal.

Cast
 Jack Buchanan as Lord Robert Brent
 Fay Wray as Hilda Beach-Howard
 James Carew as Mr Beach-Howard
 Fred Emney as Lord Axminster
 Olive Blakeney as Mrs Beach-Howard
 Kate Cutler as Lady Axminster
 Ronald Squire as Eccles
 Maire O'Neill as Mrs Gore
 Ethel Stewart as Rosie
 Ben Welden as Tramp
 W.T. Ellwanger as Porteous

Production
Come Out of the Pantry was the first British film to star Fay Wray, three years after her appearance in King Kong (1933). She reportedly commented that she felt a certain resentment from the British cast and crew against the presence of an American star. Wray went on to make three more films in Britain, including When Knights Were Bold (1936), also with Jack Buchanan.

Critical reception
Come Out of the Pantry is one of many comedy films that feature aristocratic protagonists who pose as servants, and comparisons have been drawn with the films In the Soup (1936), Ball at Savoy (1936) and Mr Cinders (1934), a retelling of the classic fairy tale Cinderella. The theme of the "aristocrat in disguise" as a member of the lower classes, and the scenario of romance between members of different social classes became popular tropes in fiction of the interwar period, and Come Out of the Pantry has also been compared to Jack Buchanan's other films in this genre such as A Man of Mayfair and Goodnight, Vienna (both 1932).

Writing for The Spectator in 1935, Graham Greene was critical of the film's portrayal of British social class, and criticised the film as a typical example of the "snobby" and classist English film whose subtle social humour "would be quite meaningless to any but an English audience".

TV Guide called it an "entertaining musical."

Songs
The film includes the following songs:

"Everything Stops for Tea", by Al Hoffman, Al Goodhart and Maurice Sigler; Sung by Jack Buchanan
"From One Minute to Another", by Al Hoffman, Al Goodhart and Maurice Sigler

A version of "Everything Stops for Tea" was later recorded by blues singer John Baldry on his 1972 album Everything Stops for Tea, produced by Elton John and Rod Stewart. The song was later rewritten (except for the chorus) by chap hop artist Professor Elemental in his 2012 album, Father of Invention.

See also
Come Out of the Kitchen (1919)
Honey (1930)
Spring in Park Lane (1948)

References

External links

1935 films
British musical films
1935 musical films
Films directed by Jack Raymond
British black-and-white films
British and Dominions Studios films
Films shot at Imperial Studios, Elstree
Films based on works by Alice Duer Miller
1930s English-language films
1930s British films